Colonial Apartments may refer to:
(sorted by state, then city/town)

 Linwood Colonial Apartments, Indianapolis, Indiana, listed on the National Register of Historic Places (NRHP) in Marion County
 Colonial Apartments (Bangor, Maine), listed on the NRHP in Penobscot County
 Colonial Apartments (Carthage, Missouri), listed on the NRHP in Jasper County
 Colonial Apartments (Fairmont, West Virginia), listed on the NRHP in Marion County